This is a list of schools in Middlesbrough, in the English county of North Yorkshire.

State-funded schools

Primary schools

Abingdon Primary School
Acklam Whin Primary School
Archibald Primary School
The Avenue Primary School
Ayresome Primary School
Beech Grove Primary School
Berwick Hills Primary School
Brambles Primary Academy
Breckon Hill Primary School
Caldicotes Primary Academy
Captain Cook Primary School
Chandlers Ridge Academy
Corpus Christi RC Primary School
Easterside Academy
Green Lane Primary Academy
Hemlington Hall Academy
Kader Academy
Lingfield Primary School
Linthorpe Community Primary School
Marton Manor Primary School
Newham Bridge Primary School
Newport Primary School
North Ormesby Primary Academy
Pallister Park Primary School
Park End Primary School
Pennyman Primary Academy
Rose Wood Academy
Sacred Heart RC Primary School
St Alphonsus' RC Primary School
St Augustine's RC Primary School
St Bernadette's RC Primary School
St Clare's RC Primary School
St Edward's RC Primary School
St Gerard's RC Primary School
St Joseph's RC Primary School
St Puis X RC Primary School
St Thomas More RC Primary School
Sunnyside Academy
Thorntree Academy
Viewley Hill Academy
Whinney Banks Primary School

Secondary schools

Acklam Grange School
The King's Academy
Macmillan Academy  
Outwood Academy Acklam
Outwood Academy Ormesby
Outwood Academy Riverside
Trinity Catholic College 
Unity City Academy

Special and alternative schools

Beverley School
Discovery Special Academy
Hollis Academy
Holmwood School
Priory Woods School
River Tees High Academy
River Tees Middle Academy
River Tees Primary Academy

Further education
Middlesbrough College
The Northern School of Art

Independent schools

Special and alternative schools
Hopefields Education CiC
Keys Tees Valley College
Reintegreat Education Solutions

Middlesbrough
Schools in Middlesbrough
Lists of buildings and structures in North Yorkshire